State Route 145 (SR 145) is a  state highway in the central part of the U.S. state of Alabama. The southern terminus of the highway is at an intersection with U.S. Route 31 (US 31) and SR 22 in Clanton. The northern terminus of the highway is at an intersection with Shelby County Route 61 (CR 61) in Wilsonville.

Route description

SR 145 is aligned on a two-lane route for its duration. It serves as a connector route between Clanton and Lay Lake, which lies along the Chilton–Shelby county line. After leaving Clanton, the highway travels to the north through rural areas of farm and timberland, and travels through no major cities or towns. It leaves Chilton County and enters Shelby County after crossing Waxahatchee Creek.

Unlike most state routes in Alabama, the northern terminus of SR 145 is at a junction with a county road. Shelby County Route 61 north of SR 145 serves as a continuation of the state route, heading into Wilsonville, where the route intersects SR 25.

Major intersections

See also

References

145
Transportation in Chilton County, Alabama
Transportation in Shelby County, Alabama